The St. Francis of Assisi Church or simply Church of St. Francis, is a parish of the Roman Catholic Church located in Baie Lazare, on the island of Mahé in the Seychelles.

It is under the Diocese of Port Victoria or Seychelles (Dioecesis Portus Victoriae or seychellarum).

History
The first church dates back to 1888, but the current church was opened in 1953. Its architecture has become a tourist attraction.

Recently, the building one of the most important architectural works of the place was reopened after it was closed for a while for renovations. The funds used come from parishioners and the state.

See also
Catholic Church in Seychelles
St. Francis of Assisi Church (disambiguation)

References

Roman Catholic churches in Seychelles
Roman Catholic churches completed in 1888
19th-century Roman Catholic church buildings in Seychelles